Harsh may refer to:

Places 
 Harsh, Sikar, village in Rajasthan, India

People with the given name
 Harsh Chitale, an Indian businessman
 Harsh Mander (born 1955), an Indian civil rights activist
 Harsh Mankad (born 1979), an Indian tennis player
 Harsh Mayar (born 1998), an Indian actor
 Harsh Rajput, an Indian actor
 Harsh Vardhan (disambiguation), multiple people

People with the surname 
 John Harsh (1825–1906), an American politician
 Griffith R. Harsh (born 1953), an American surgeon
 Vivian G. Harsh (1890–1960), an American librarian

See also
 Harshness

Indian masculine given names